This is a list of generalist television channels grouped by country and network.

Americas

Argentina
TVP
El Nueve
El Trece
Telefe
América
Net TV
Bravo TV

Brazil
Band
Globo
RecordTV
RedeTV!
SBT
CNT
TV Brasil
TV Cultura

Bolivia
ATB
Unitel 
Bolivisión 
Bolivia TV
Red UNO
PAT
RTP

Canada 
 English language
 CBC Television
 CTV
 Global
 French language
 Ici Radio-Canada Télé
 TVA
 Noovo

Colombia
RCN Televisión
Caracol Televisión
Channel 1
Señal Colombia

Chile
TVN 
Mega
Chilevisión
Canal 13
TV MAS 2
TV+
La Red
Telecanal

Ecuador
Canal Uno (defunct)
Ecuador TV
Ecuavisa
Gamavisión
Oromar TV
RTS
Teleamazonas
TC Televisión
TVC

Honduras
 Canal 5
 Telecadena 7 y 4
 Canal 8
 Canal 11
 Canal 12
 VTV
 D Televisión
 TV Azteca Honduras

Mexico
Grupo Imagen: Imagen Televisión
Instituto Politécnico Nacional: Canal Once
TelevisaUnivision: Las Estrellas
TV Azteca: Azteca Uno, Azteca 7

Panama
 RPC
 TVN
 RCM (defunct)
 Telemetro

Paraguay
Paraguay TV
Paravisión
SNT
Telefuturo
Trece
Unicanal
Sur
GEN

Peru
Latina TV
América TV
TV Perú
ATV
ATV Sur
Panamericana TV
Global Television
Willax TV
Viva TV
TV Mundo
TV Cosmos
Sol TV
Antena TV
CTC
TV UNSA
Fuego TV

United States 
English language
 Disney: ABC
 Fox Corporation: FOX
 NBCUniversal: NBC
 Paramount Global: CBS
 PBS

Spanish language
 Estrella Media: Estrella TV
 NBCUniversal: Telemundo
 TelevisaUnivision: Univision
 TV Azteca: Azteca América

Uruguay
Canal 4
Canal 5
Canal 10
La Red
Teledoce
VTV

Venezuela
Venevisión
Televen
TVes
Ávila TV
Vepaco TV
TLT

Oceania

Australia
ABC TV
SBS
Seven
Nine
Ten

New Zealand
 TVNZ 1
 TVNZ 2
 Three
 Eden
 Prime

Europe

Albania 
 RTSH 1
 RTSH 2
 RTSH 3
 Top Channel
 TV Klan
 Vizion Plus

Austria 
 ORF 1
 ORF 2
 Puls 4
 ATV
 ATV2

Bulgaria 
 BNT 1
 BNT 2
 BTV
 Nova

Belgium 
Dutch languages
 Eén
 VTM
 Play4

French languages
 La Une
 RTL-TVI

Croatia 
 HRT1
 HRT2
 Nova
 RTL

Czech Republic 
 ČT1
 ČT2
 Nova
 Prima
 TV Barrandov
 Televize Seznam

Denmark 
 DR1
 DR2
 TV 2
 TV3
 Kanal 4
 Kanal 5

Estonia 
 Eesti language
 ETV
 ETV2
 Kanal 2
 TV3

 Russian language
 ETV+
 Kanal 7
 TV3 Plus

Finland 
 YLE TV1
 YLE TV2
 MTV3
 Nelonen
 YLE Teema Fem (timeshared from Swedish language)
 TV5

France 
 TF1 Group
 TF1
 TMC
 TFX

 France Télévisions
 France 2
 France 3

 M6 Group
 M6
 W9
 6ter

 Canal+ Group
 Canal+
 C8
 CStar

 Arte
 Arte

 NRJ Group
 NRJ 12
 Chérie 25

Germany 
ARD
Das Erste
BR Fernsehen
hr-fernsehen
MDR Fernsehen
NDR Fernsehen
Radio Bremen TV
RBB Fernsehen
SR Fernsehen
SWR Fernsehen
WDR Fernsehen

ZDF
 ZDF

Seven.One Entertainment Group
 Sat.1
 Prosieben
 Kabel Eins

RTL Deutschland
 RTL
 RTL ZWEI
 VOX

Greece 
ERT1
ERT2
ERT3
Alpha TV
ANT1
Mega Channel
Star Channel

Hungary 
 MTVA
 Duna

 TV2 Group
 TV2

 RTL Hungary
 RTL

Iceland 
 RÚV
 Stöð 2
 Stöð 3 (defunct)

Italy 
 Rai
 Rai 1
 Rai 2
 Rai 3
 Rai 4
 Rai 5
 Mediaset
 Canale 5
 Italia 1
 Rete 4
 Cairo Communicaton
 La7
 Sky Italia
 TV8
 Discovery Italia
 Nove

Kosovo 
RTK 1
RTV21
Kohavision
Klan Kosova
T7
TëVë 1

Latvia 
 Latvian language
 LTV1
 LTV7
 TV3

 Russian language
 Kanal 7
 TV3 Plus

Lithuania 
 LRT TV
 LRT Plius
 LNK
 TV3

Moldova 
 Moldova 1
 Moldova 2
 Prime
 Pro TV Chișinău
 TVR Moldova

Netherlands 
NPO
 NPO 1
 NPO 2
 NPO 3

RTL Nederland
 RTL4
 RTL5
 RTL7
 RTL8

Talpa Networks
 SBS6
 NET5
 Veronica
 SBS9

Norway 
 NRK1
 NRK2
 TV2
 TV3
 TVNorge

Poland 
 TVP1
 TVP2
 TVP3
 Polsat
 TVN
 Puls 2

Portugal 
 RTP1
 RTP2
 SIC
 TVI

Republic of Ireland 
 RTÉ
 RTÉ One
 RTÉ2

Virgin Media Television
 Virgin Media One
 Virgin Media Two
 Virgin Media Three
 Virgin Media Four

Romania 
 TVR 1
 TVR 2
 TVR 3
 Pro TV
 Antena 1
 Prima TV
 Kanal D
 Național TV

Russia 
 Channel One
 Russia 1
 NTV
 OTR
 TNT
 CTC
 5TV
 REN TV

Spain 
RTVE
 La 1
 La 2
Atresmedia
 Antena 3
 LaSexta
Mediaset España
 Telecinco
 Cuatro

Slovakia 
 :1
 :2
 Markíza
 JOJ

Slovenia 
 TV SLO 1
 TV SLO 2
 Pop
 Kanal A
 Planet TV

Sweden 
 SVT1
 SVT2
 TV3
 TV4
 Kanal 5

Switzerland 
 Deutsch language
 SRF 1
 SRF zwei
 3+
 S1
 TV24
 TV25

 French language
 RTS 1
 RTS 2

 Italian language
 RSI La 1
 RSI La 2

Turkey
TRT 1
Kanal D
ATV
STAR
SHOW
FOX
Uçankuş TV
TV8
Kanal 7
teve2
Beyaz TV

Ukraine 
 Pershyi
 1+1
 ICTV
 Inter
 Kanal Ukraine (defunct)
 Novyi Kanal
 STB
 NTN

United Kingdom 
 BBC One
 BBC Two
 ITV1
 Channel 4
 Channel 5
 Sky Showcase

Middle East & North Africa

Algeria 
 TV1
 TV2
 Canal Algérie
 A3
 Channel 4
 Berbère Télévision
 Echourouk TV
 Dzaïr TV
 El Djazairia
 KBC
 Beur TV
 El Bilad
 Numidia
 Ennahar Laki
 L'Index TV
 Bahia TV
 DTV Algérie
 DTV One
 DTV 14
 DTV 27
 DTV 31

Israel 
 Channel 9
 Channel 10 (defunct)
 Kan 11
 Keshet 12
 Reshet 13
 Now 14
 Makan 33

Morocco 
 Al Aoula
 2M
 Medi 1 TV (2010–2016)

Saudi Arabia 
 MBC
 MBC 1
 Saudi TV
 Saudi TV
 Saudi TV 2

United Arab Emirates 
 Abu Dhabi TV
 Emirates
 Abu Dhabi TV
 DMI
Dubai TV

Egypt 
 Nile
 Nile TV

Asia

China
 CCTV-1
 Anhui TV
 BTV
 Dragon TV
 Hunan TV
 Jiangsu TV
 Shandong TV
 Phoenix TV
 Shanghai TV
 Shenzhen TV
 Tianjin TV
 Zhejiang TV

Hong Kong
 RTHK TV 31
 Phoenix TV
 TVB Jade
 TVB Pearl
 HOYTV
 ViuTV
 ViuTVsix

India
 DD National
 Colors TV
 Zee TV
 Star Plus
 Sony Entertainment Television

Indonesia
 TVRI
 RCTI
 MNCTV
 GTV
 SCTV
 Indosiar
 antv
 VTV
 Trans TV
 Trans7
 NET.
 RTV
 JPM TV
 JTV
 NTV

Japan
 NHK G
 NTV
 TV Asahi
 TBS
 TV Tokyo
 Fuji TV

Macau
 TDM Ou Mun
 Canal Macau

Malaysia
 TV1
 TV2
 TV3
 NTV7 (defunct)
 8TV
 TV9
 TV Okey

Pakistan
 ARY Digital
 Geo TV
 Hum TV
 PTV Home
 TV One
 Urdu 1

Philippines
PTV
A2Z (via ABS-CBN)
GMA
GTV
Kapamilya Channel
TV5

Singapore
Channel 5
Channel 8
Suria
Vasantham
Channel i (defunct)

South Korea
 Channel A
 EBS 1TV
 EBS 2TV
 JTBC
 KBS 1TV
 KBS 2TV
 MBC TV
 MBN
 SBS TV
 TV Chosun
 TvN

Taiwan
 TTV
 CTV
 CTS
 FTV
 PTS
 TVBS

Thailand
NBT2HD
Thai PBS 3
TV5 HD
Workpoint
True4U
GMM 25
Channel 8
MONO29
MCOT HD
ONE 31 (HD)
Thairath TV
Channel 3 HD
Amarin TV
Channel 7 HD
PPTV HD36
Bright TV (defunct)

Vietnam
VTV3
VTC1
SCTV4
SCTV11
SCTV18
VTC5
HTVC Plus
K+ LIFE

References 

Lists of television channels by content